Nobuta Group Masters GC Ladies is an annual golf tournament for professional female golfers on LPGA of Japan Tour. It is usually played in October and in recent years at the Masters Golf Club, Miki, Hyogo. It was founded in 2003.

Winners 
2022  Haruka Kawasaki
2021  Ayaka Furue
2020 Cancelled
2019  Asuka Kashiwabara
2018  Ahn Sun-ju
2017  Momoko Ueda
2016  Jeon Mi-jeong
2015  Lee Ji-hee
2014  Shiho Oyama 
2013  Sakura Yokomine
2012  So-hee Kim
2011  Shiho Oyama
2010  Sakura Yokomine
2009  Jiyai Shin
2008  Shiho Oyama
2007  Miho Koga
2006  Miho Koga
2005  Paula Creamer
2004  Ai Miyazato
2003  Hiromi Takesue

External links 
Masters Golf Club (Nobuta Group)

LPGA of Japan Tour events
Golf tournaments in Japan
2003 establishments in Japan
Recurring sporting events established in 2003